Parola di ladro (internationally released as Honor Among Thieves) is a 1957 Italian  comedy film. It stars actor Gabriele Ferzetti. This film represents the directorial debut of Gianni Puccini and Nanni Loy. For this film Andrea Checchi was awarded a Silver Ribbon for best supporting actor.

References

External links

1957 films
1950s Italian-language films
Films directed by Nanni Loy
Films directed by Gianni Puccini
Films scored by Mario Nascimbene
Italian comedy films
1957 comedy films
1957 directorial debut films
1950s Italian films